Neulußheim is a town in the district of Rhein-Neckar in Baden-Württemberg in Germany, with about 7,100 inhabitants. Larger cities in the surrounding area include Speyer, Mannheim and Heidelberg.
It was founded in 1711 at a crossroads by Julius Schickard. Due to the logistical advantage and the construction of a station on the Mannheim-Karlsruhe railway line in 1870, the hamlet rapidly increased in population.
The railway station with an overhead crossing was built in 1984 by Gottfried Böhm, a famous German architect. In 2020, the German public broadcasting service "ZDF" published a documentary about the ongoing construction of two elevators and other restoration works at the station.

Notable Sights
 
Notable sights include the "Turmuhrenmuseum" and the old railway station.

References

Rhein-Neckar-Kreis